Ronilson Matias de Oliveira (16 July 1990, Santos, São Paulo) is a Brazilian sprint canoeist. At the 2012 Summer Olympics, he competed in the Men's C-1 200 metres, and the men's C-2 1000 m with Erlon Silva.

References

Brazilian male canoeists
Living people
Olympic canoeists of Brazil
Canoeists at the 2012 Summer Olympics
Pan American Games silver medalists for Brazil
1990 births
Pan American Games medalists in canoeing
South American Games gold medalists for Brazil
South American Games medalists in canoeing
Canoeists at the 2011 Pan American Games
Competitors at the 2010 South American Games
Sportspeople from Santos, São Paulo
Medalists at the 2011 Pan American Games
21st-century Brazilian people